Fernando Manuel Beltrán Machado (born 18 August 1981) is a Mexican former professional boxer who competed from 2000 to 2015. He held the IBO featherweight title and twice challenged for a world super bantamweight title.

Professional career

IBO Featherweight Championship
On August 22, 2008 Beltrán won the IBO Featherweight title by beating South Africa's Takalani Ndlovu in Sommet Center, Nashville, Tennessee.

See also
List of Mexican boxing world champions
List of IBO World Champions

References

External links

Boxers from Sinaloa
World boxing champions
Featherweight boxers
1981 births
Living people
Mexican male boxers